Villa del Parque is an Argentine Football club in Necochea, in the Buenos Aires Province of Argentina. The club played in the regionalised 4th level of Argentine football Torneo Argentino B until 2007, when it resigned from the league.

See also
List of football clubs in Argentina
Argentine football league system

Association football clubs established in 1961
Football clubs in Buenos Aires Province
1961 establishments in Argentina